Georg Schmidt may refer to:

 Georg Friedrich Schmidt (1712–1775), German painter and engraver

 Georg Philipp Schmidt von Lübeck (1766–1849), German poet
 Georg Schmidt (football coach) (1927–1990), Austrian football coach
 Georg Schmidt (trade unionist) (1875–1946), German trade union leader and politician